Paper cut sculpture, a form of papercutting, is a contemporary development of a traditional art form. Instead of flat, two-dimensional pieces, the art is given a three-dimensional form. Different artists have used a variety of different methods. A notable example is Nahoko Kojima, a Japanese artist who utilised nylon threads to suspend individual large sheets of washi paper to form the bodies of animals and other natural figures.

See also

 Leaf carving
 Scherenschnitte
 Silhouette
 Vytynanky (Wycinanki)
 Origami
 Kirie (art)
 Kirigami
 Pop-up book

Notes

Paper art
Sculpture techniques